The Division of Gwydir was an Australian electoral division in the state of New South Wales. The division was proclaimed in 1900, and was one of the original 65 divisions to be contested at the first federal election. As a result of the electoral redistribution of 13 September 2006, Gwydir was abolished and ceased to exist at the 2007 federal election. 

Gwydir was named for the Gwydir River (which in turn was named by the explorer Allan Cunningham after his patron Peter Burrell, Baron Gwydyr, who took his title from Gwydir Castle in Wales). The division was located in western New South Wales, and at the time of its abolition included the towns of Bourke, Moree, Mudgee and Brewarrina. 

The seat was a stronghold of the Australian Workers' Union, and until the 1940s was one of the few country seats where the Australian Labor Party usually did well. It was in Labor hands for all but six terms from 1903 to 1949. However, it was held by the National Party from 1949 onward, and from the mid-1970s onward it was usually fairly safe for that party. 

Its last Labor member, William Scully, was a Cabinet minister in the Ben Chifley government. The final member, John Anderson, was Leader of the National Party and Deputy Prime Minister in the Howard Government until he resigned the position.

Gwydir was held by two deputy leaders of the National Party, Anderson and his predecessor in Gwydir, Ralph Hunt.

In September 2006 the New South Wales redistribution commissioners decided to abolish Gwydir. The abolition took effect at the 2007 federal election. Most of the division became part of the Division of Parkes, while some towns in the Upper Hunter Shire (mainly Scone, Aberdeen, Merriwa and Murrurundi) were absorbed into the Division of Hunter.

Members

Election results

References
Psephos: Adam Carr's Election Archive
The Poll Bludger
ABC Elections
Australian Electoral Commission

1901 establishments in Australia
Constituencies established in 1901
Former electoral divisions of Australia